Straight in a Gay Gay World was the third studio album by Australian rock band, Skyhooks. The album was released in August 1976. With the exception of "Million Dollar Riff", it was recorded at The Record Plant in Sausalito, California, after the band's first tour of the United States earlier in the same year. The title and songs are a sort of view the band had on their experience in the States. The album was produced by former Daddy Cool leader Ross Wilson. It peaked at No. 3 on the Australian charts.

At the Australian 1976 King of Pop Awards the album won Best Cover Design.

"Million Dollar Riff" was released as a single in November 1975 and it reached No. 6 in Australia. Two further singles were lifted from this album, "This is My City" and "Blue Jeans", both in 1976 which peaked at No. 32 and No. 12 respectively on Australian charts.

Details

Prior to release, Strachan said of the songs in RAM, "Some of 'em are the strongest things the band's doing. There's one called "Sydney", that's all about Sydney. We were considering using it for a single instead of "Million Dollar Riff". And "I'm Normal". It's all about a guy who throws away his rubber sheets and dildos and vibrators and sex pills to get back to holding hands."

Macainsh said "Blue Jeans" had been an early song from the band. "Ross Wilson has always tried to get it recorded, but we've never been real keen on the idea til we got stuck for a song on this album. We wanted a couple of laidback tunes to round it off rather than have an album of ravers and up stuff."

Reception
Reviewed in Australian music magazine RAM at the time of release, it was called, "methedrine power rock. It's jingle-jangley and crazy-tempered with guitar that shrill jackhammer like giant mosquitoes – dive-bombing into rhythms that are playing epileptic leap-frog around your stereo speakers." The song "Crazy Heart" was complimented for being "sweetly mellow" compared to the rest of the album.

Track listing

Personnel
Shirley Strachan – lead vocals
Red Symons – guitar, backing and lead (9) vocals, keyboards
Bob "Bongo" Starkie – guitar, backing vocals
Greg Macainsh – bass guitar, backing vocals
Imants Alfred Strauks – drums, backing vocals, percussion

Charts

References

Skyhooks (band) albums
1976 albums
Glam rock albums by Australian artists
Mushroom Records albums